So Far So Good is a compilation album by Canadian rock musician Bryan Adams, released by A&M Records in November 1993. The album reached number six on the Billboard 200 in 1994 and was a number one hit in the United Kingdom and many other countries.

The album contains songs from Cuts Like a Knife (1983) to Waking Up the Neighbours (1991), and a new single, "Please Forgive Me". Originally, the song "So Far So Good" was going to be included on the album so the album started and finished with a new song but it was dropped. The song was included on disc two of Anthology.

The only song on the album that has never been released as a single is "Kids Wanna Rock" from Reckless (1984), which replaced "One Night Love Affair", taken from the same album. Although the latter had been released as a single in 1985, charting in Canada, the United States and Japan, 'Kids Wanna Rock" proved to be a popular live staple during Adams' world tours. In fact, various live recordings of "Kids Wanna Rock" were issued as B-sides between 1984 and 1992. Other notable singles that were left off include "Hearts on Fire" and "Victim of Love" from 1987, the moderately successful "Thought I'd Died and Gone to Heaven" from 1991, and the 1992 US single "Touch the Hand". Early versions of the album had a circular black sticker on the jewelcase, covering the wheel, featuring the text "The Best of Bryan Adams" in red letters. Also, the album cover was available in different colour schemes, varying from dark green, to light brown and bright orange. The album has been repackaged several times; some versions included the singles "All for Love" from 1994 or "Have You Ever Really Loved a Woman?" from 1995.

So Far So Good is his best selling record in many countries, with sales exceeding 13 million copies worldwide.

Track listing

So Far So Good (And More) 
A VHS video compilation titled So Far So Good (And More) was released on March 22, 1994, and contains eighteen videos, including some musical videos of songs that were not included in the CD album.

Track listing 
 "Can't Stop This Thing We Started"
 "Cuts Like a Knife"
 "Please Forgive Me"
 "It's Only Love"
 "Into the Fire"
 "Heat of the Night"
 "Heaven"
 "Somebody"
 "(Everything I Do) I Do It for You"
 "Diana"
 "When the Night Comes"
 "I Fought the Law"
 "Straight from the Heart"
 "Run to You"
 "C'mon Everybody"
 "Summer of '69"
 "Do I Have to Say the Words?"
 "All for Love"

Charts

Weekly charts

Year-end charts

Decade-end charts

Certifications

See also 
 List of best-selling albums in Australia

References 

1993 greatest hits albums
Bryan Adams albums
Albums produced by Bob Clearmountain
A&M Records compilation albums